Dana Library may refer to:

John Cotton Dana Library, research library at Rutgers University–Newark, New Jersey
Dana Library and Research Centre, a section of the Science Museum, London
Dana Library, a former name of the Cambridge Public Library in Cambridge, Massachusetts